= Foundation for Conservation of Atlantic Salmon =

Charitable organisation for salmon conservation

The Foundation for Conservation of Atlantic Salmon (FCAS) - formerly The Atlantic Salmon Conservation Foundation (ASCF) – is a registered charitable organization whose focus is the conservation of wild Atlantic salmon and its habitat in Atlantic Canada and Quebec. After a dormant period, the foundation was re-launched under a new name on May 18, 2025.

The then ASCF was established through a one-time grant from the Government of Canada in 2007. The Foundation provides funding to community volunteer organizations using income from its trust fund, and helps these groups work together with government and Aboriginal organizations to plan and manage wild Atlantic salmon conservation at the watershed level.
